Batsheva Esther Kanievsky (February 1, 1932 – October 15, 2011), known as Rebbetzin Kanievsky, was a well-known rebbetzin from Bnei Brak, Israel. She was the wife of Rabbi Chaim Kanievsky, and the oldest daughter of Rabbi Yosef Shalom Eliashiv of Jerusalem, who was known as "the greatest posek" (halakhic decisor). Her grandfather was Rabbi Aryeh Levin. Several hundred people would visit her apartment every week. She never left Israel. She was known as a "miracle worker" and devoted her life to helping people and performing good deeds. More than 50,000 people attended her funeral.

References

Rebbetzins
People from Bnei Brak
Israeli Orthodox Jews
1932 births
2011 deaths